This is a list of Arabic language writers.

A
 Abdelkader Alloula
 Ahmed Shawqi

B
 Kerolos Bahgat

G
Ghalib Halasa

I
 Abdelghani Ibrahim

K
 Safa Khulusi

R
 Rachid Boudjedra
 Rachid Mimouni

M
 Malek Bennabi

N
 Bhai Nand Lal

Y
 Yasmina Khadra

Lists of writers by language

Arabic Language Writers